Grigny is a commune in the Pas-de-Calais department in the Hauts-de-France region of France.

Geography
A village situated at the edge of the forest of Hesdin, some 13 miles (21 km) southeast of Montreuil-sur-Mer on the D94E1 road.

Population

Places of interest
 Church of St. Gertrude, dating from the seventeenth century.

See also
 Communes of the Pas-de-Calais department

References

External links

 Statistical data, INSEE

Communes of Pas-de-Calais
Artois